Goodenia armitiana, commonly known as narrow-leaved goodenia or fine goodenia, is a species of flowering plant in the family Goodeniaceae and is endemic to northern Australia. It is an erect herb with sticky or vanished cylindrical leaves, racemes of yellow flowers with leaf-like bracts at the base, and more or less spherical fruit.

Description
Flowering occurs in most months and the fruit is a more or less spherical capsule  in diameter.

Taxonomy and naming
Goodenia armitiana was first formally described in 1877 by Ferdinand von Mueller in Fragmenta Phytographiae Australiae from material collected near the Lynd River. The specific epithet (armitiana) honours William Edington de Margrat Armit, who collected the type specimens.

Distribution and habitat
Narrow-leaved goodenia grows in open habitats from the Kimberley region of Western Australia and through the Northern Territory to north-east Queensland.

Conservation status
Goodenia armitiana is classified as "not threatened" by the Western Australian Government Department of Parks and Wildlife, and as of "least concern" under the Queensland Government Nature Conservation Act 1992 and the Northern Territory Government Territory Parks and Wildlife Conservation Act 1976.

References

armitiana
Eudicots of Western Australia
Flora of the Northern Territory
Flora of Queensland
Plants described in 1877
Taxa named by Ferdinand von Mueller